Aleksandr Vladimirovich Yeliseyev (born 15 November 1991) is a Russian professional football player. He plays for FC Tekstilshchik Ivanovo.

Club career
He made his Russian Premier League debut for FC Krylia Sovetov Samara on 7 May 2011 in a game against FC Tom Tomsk.

References

External links
 
 Profile by Football National League

1991 births
Footballers from Moscow
Living people
Russian footballers
Russia youth international footballers
Association football defenders
Association football midfielders
Russian Premier League players
FC Shinnik Yaroslavl players
PFC Krylia Sovetov Samara players
FC Volgar Astrakhan players
FC Baltika Kaliningrad players
FC Torpedo Moscow players
FC Moscow players
FC Veles Moscow players
FC Chayka Peschanokopskoye players
FC Tekstilshchik Ivanovo players